MV Queen of the Oceans is a  owned by Seajets, a Greek/Cypriot ferry company. She was built by Fincantieri in Monfalcone, Italy and measures . She entered service in February 2000 as Ocean Princess for Princess Cruises before being transferred to P&O Cruises in 2002, operating as Oceana until 2020.

History

2000–2002: Ocean Princess
Oceana was originally ordered by P&O to serve in the Princess Cruises fleet. She was named by Ali MacGraw and Ryan O'Neal and entered service as Ocean Princess on 16 February 2000. During the winter season, Ocean Princess was positioned in the southern Caribbean, while in summer she operated in Alaskan waters. Shortly after her launch, P&O demerged its cruise ship operations and Ocean Princess came under the ownership of P&O Princess Cruises, whilst continuing to serve in the Princess Cruises fleet.

2002–2020: Oceana
In November 2002, Ocean Princess entered service with P&O Cruises, operating from Fort Lauderdale, Florida. Her official naming ceremony took place in Southampton, England on 21 May 2003. She was christened by Anne, Princess Royal. 

In 2003, P&O Princess Cruises merged with Carnival Corporation to become Carnival Corporation & plc. As a result, Oceana came under the ownership of Carnival UK, but continued to operate with the P&O Cruises fleet.

Oceana was last renovated from 29 November and 17 December 2017 after she underwent a £31 million refit at the Blohm+Voss shipyard in Hamburg. Technical work and public area refurbishment were undertaken.

On 7 July 2020, amid the COVID-19 pandemic, P&O announced that it had sold Oceana to an undisclosed buyer.

2020–present: Queen of the Oceans
On 8 July 2020, Greek newspaper Naftemporiki reported that the Iliopoulos family, who leads Seajets, was considering purchasing Oceana to begin cruise operations. The reports were later confirmed after Oceana was delivered to Seajets on 21 July 2020 in Patras. The former Oceana was later spotted with the Union flag on her bow painted over and bearing a new name, Queen of the Oceans, while docked in Patras.

Design
As Oceana, the vessel had 10 passenger decks. Passenger facilities included 12 bars and four restaurants, including an open-air restaurant. Other facilities included a gym, sports court, casino, golf simulator, a spa, four swimming pools, and the main entertainment venue, a 530-seat theatre.

See also

References

External links

 Official Web site

 

Ships of Seajets
Ships of P&O Cruises
Ships built in Monfalcone
Ships built by Fincantieri
1999 ships
Ships of Princess Cruises
Passenger ships of Bermuda